Codrington is a settlement in South Gloucestershire, England. It is located near Junction 18 of the M4 motorway south of Wapley and Yate.

Codrington is a hamlet situated alongside the B4465 road. It was formerly in the civil parish of Wapley-cum-Codrington in the hundred of Grumbald's Ash. It is now in Dodington parish, under the administration of the unitary authority of South Gloucestershire.  It had one pub, the Wishing Well, which was formerly the Codrington Arms. The pub was linked to the Codrington Family, who used to be based at Codrington Court before moving to nearby Dodington Park. The area also has a Baptist church in Wapley Road.  Now the area is best known for its golf course on the outskirts called The Players Club. The hamlet is mentioned in Lemon Jelly's "Ramblin' Man".

References

External links

 Codrington Baptist Church

Villages in South Gloucestershire District